Osmaci (Serbian: Осмаци) is a village and a municipality located in eastern Republika Srpska, an entity of Bosnia and Herzegovina. As of 2013, it has a population of 6,016 inhabitants. There is also a small, uninhabited, part of Osmaci that is in Kalesija municipality.

History
The municipality was created from part of the territory of the pre-war municipality of Kalesija that was assigned to Republika Srpska by the Dayton Agreement. The rest of the Kalesija municipality is in the Federation.

Demographics

Population

Ethnic composition

Mass grave
In the village Hajvazi, located in Osmaci, on 20 September 2012, the International Commission on Missing Persons uncovered a mass grave containing the remains of eight Bosnian Muslim individuals, seven men and one woman killed by Serbs in November 1992 during the Bosnian War. The victims were piled atop of each other. Their remains were exhumed from the mass grave, which was located in the yard of a private house. The exhumation concluded on 27 September 2012 and the remains were transported to the Commemorative Centre in Tuzla for forensic testing and DNA analysis to determine the identity of the victims. Following the discovery of the eight victims, there are still an additional 30 Bosnian Muslim victims from the Osmaci area that remain missing.

On 1 June 2013, some of the victims found in the mass grave were buried in a Šehidsko mezarje (Martyr Cemetery) in Memići alongside victims found in the Crni Vrh mass grave and the mass grave in Kazanbašča by Zvornik.

See also
 Municipalities of Republika Srpska

References

External links

 Osmaci City homepage

Populated places in Osmaci
Populated places in Kalesija
Cities and towns in Republika Srpska
Municipalities of Republika Srpska